"Black on Black" is a song written and performed by Canadian singer Dalbello. It was first released as a single in 1985 and was re-recorded for Dalbello's fifth studio album she, released in 1987. In 1993, American rock band Heart recorded a version as "Black on Black II" for their eleventh studio album Desire Walks On.

Dalbello version

Dalbello wrote and demoed "Black on Black" in 1985, and it was first released as a non-album single in Europe in the late part of that year. The song was included on the soundtrack to the American erotic romantic drama film 9½ Weeks, which was released in February 1986. The director Adrian Lyne had heard Dalbello's 1984 album Whomanfoursays and contacted her with the request of writing the film's score. Due to touring commitments, she was unable to accept the offer, but instead provided the completed demo versions of "Black on Black" and "Baby Doll" for his consideration.

Despite its release as a single and inclusion on the 9½ Weeks soundtrack, Dalbello always considered the 1985 recording of "Black on Black" to be an unfinished demo. She would release a completed version of the song on her 1987 album she. The she version was also released as a single in some European countries in 1988.

"Black on Black" starts with a looped sample from Gregorio Allegri's work "Miserere mei, Deus".

Critical reception
In a review of the 1989 Canadian re-issue of she, Evelyn Erskine of The Ottawa Citizen described "Black on Black" as "an awesome piece of pop music". She added, "It deals with religious organizations and the power they have over their congregations, a theme that Dalbello unfolds in a way that grates on the edge of profanity while firing out the lyrics like a torrent of daggers." Gerry Krochak of The Leader-Post considered the song to be one of the "marvelous vehicles" on she for Dalbello's "powerful, clear voice" and "talents as [a] songwriter, instrumentalist and programmer".

Track listing
7-inch single
"Black on Black" – 4:00
"Baby Doll" – 3:34

12-inch single
"Black on Black" (Extended Version) – 6:15
"Baby Doll" – 3:34

7-inch single (1988 release)
"Black on Black" – 4:21
"Baby Doll" – 4:05

Personnel

1985 version
 Dalbello – vocals, synthesizers, DMX drum program
 Asher Horowitz – guitar
 Steve Webster – bass
 Rob Yale – fairlight programming

Production
 Dalbello – producer, mixing
 Michael Beinhorn – producer
 Lenny DeRose – engineer, mixing

Other
 Heather Brown – art direction, design
 Douglas Brown – photography

1987 version
 Dalbello – vocals, backing vocals, keyboards, Hammond B3, drums
 Asher Horowitz – guitar
 Steve Webster – bass
 Scott Humphrey – PPG/HDD, drums

Production
 Dalbello – producer, mixing
 Lenny DeRose – recording, mixing
 Earl Tomo – recording assistant
 Mike Ging, Kevin Whyte, Noel Rafferty – assistant mixers

Other
 Stylorouge – design, art direction
 Richard Haughton – photography

Heart version

In 1993, American rock band Heart recorded a version of the song, titled "Black on Black II", for their eleventh studio album Desire Walks On. Heart's version was produced by John Purdell and Duane Baron, and featured additional writing credits to Ann Wilson and Nancy Wilson. "Black On Black II" was released as a promotional single in North America and a single in Australasia. It peaked at No. 4 on the Billboard Album Rock Tracks chart in November 1993.

Critical reception
In a review of Desire Walks On, Anita M. Seline of the Hartford Courant described the song as having "the familiar Heart riff and Ann Wilson's strong singing". Wallace Baine of the Santa Cruz Sentinel wrote, "Desire Walks On opens with a hurricane-force rocker called 'Black on Black II', propelled by a galloping guitar riff borrowed from the '70s hit 'Barracuda'." Michael Dunn of The Tampa Tribune wrote, "With 'Desire' and 'Black on Black II' as dual openers, the band pushes the pedal to the metal with a 'Barracuda'-like riff that shatters the speed limit in most states."

Chuck Campbell of the Scripps Howard News Service felt the song "may as well be 'Barracuda II' thanks to its familiar chops". Jim Abbott of the Orlando Sentinel noted, "The chunky, thundering bass of 'Black on Black II' sounds like Ann and Nancy are sampling from 'Barracuda' - although on that song, Ann's voice didn't quite reach the level of strident histrionics attained here."

Dale Martin of The Victoria Advocate considered the song's "hard-rock drive" to be "reminiscent of the group's 'Barracuda' days" and therefore "reassures fans that the band hasn't strayed far from its early sound". Tony Norman of the Pittsburgh Post-Gazette noted Wilson's "lethal-weapon voice" which "kicks more tail than on any tune since 'Barracuda'."

Track listing
CD single
"Black on Black II" – 3:51
"Anything Is Possible" – 5:05
"Crazy on You" (Acoustic Version) – 4:44
The Lovemongers – "Battle of Evermore" – 5:37

CD single (promo)
"Black on Black II" – 3:51

Personnel
Heart
 Ann Wilson – lead vocals
 Nancy Wilson – electric guitar, backing vocals
 Howard Leese – electric guitar
 Denny Carmassi – drums

Additional musicians
 Schuyler Deale – bass
 John Purdell – keyboards
 Dalbello – additional backing vocals

Production
 John Purdell – producer
 Duane Baron – producer, engineer
 Mick Guzauski – mixing
 George Marino – mastering

Charts

References

1985 songs
1985 singles
1988 singles
1993 singles
Heart (band) songs
Capitol Records singles
Song recordings produced by Michael Beinhorn
Songs written by Ann Wilson
Songs written by Nancy Wilson (rock musician)